Mia Emmenegger (born 17 January 2005) is a Swiss female handballer for Spono Eagles in the Spar Premium League and the Swiss national team.

Emmenegger made her official debut on the Swiss national team on 6 October 2021, against Russia. She represented Switzerland for the first time at the 2022 European Women's Handball Championship in Slovenia, Montenegro and North Macedonia.

Achievements
 SPAR Premium League
Bronze Medalist: 2022

References

External links

2005 births
Living people
Swiss female handball players
People from Lucerne
21st-century Swiss women